Cecil E. Jackson (1872–1956) was the 17th mayor of the city of Windsor, Ontario, Canada who served from 1927 to 1930.

Jackson Park
In Windsor there is a park named Jackson Park which was named after Cecil. E. Jackson. The park is said to be the most beautiful in the city of Windsor, attracting many tourists every year .

See also
List of mayors of Windsor, Ontario

External links
List of Windsor's Mayors

Mayors of Windsor, Ontario
1872 births
1956 deaths